The four-digit toad or dwarf toad (Didynamipus sjostedti) is a species of toad in the family Bufonidae. It is found in Bioko (Equatorial Guinea), southwestern Cameroon, and southeastern Nigeria. It is the only species in the genus Didynamipus.

Etymology
The specific name sjostedti honours Bror Yngve Sjöstedt, a Swedish entomologist and ornithologist who collected the type series.

Description
The snout is sharp in males but rounded in females; males also have a ridge on the top the snout that gives it an upturned appearance. The tympanum is absent. The hands and feet are reduced, with the two outer fingers and toes and the innermost toes present only as tubercles. No webbing is present. The dorsum is brown with lighter and darker mottling.

Habitat and conservation
They can occur both in leaf litter and perched atop low vegetation. Individuals found near terretrial egg masses suggest terrestrial breeding and direct development (i.e., there is no free-living larval stage).

This species appears to tolerate some habitat modification and has also been found in secondary forest and farmland, although it is still considered threatened by habitat loss primarily caused by agricultural expansion. It is known from inside or near several protected areas.

References

Didynamipus
Frogs of Africa
Amphibians of West Africa
Amphibians of Cameroon
Amphibians of Equatorial Guinea
Fauna of Nigeria
Amphibians described in 1903
Taxa named by Lars Gabriel Andersson
Taxonomy articles created by Polbot